Absolute Time in Pregroove (ATIP) is a method of storing information on an optical medium, used on CD-R and CD-RW . ATIP information is only readable on CD-R and CD-RW drives, as read-only drives don't need the information stored on it. The information indicates if the disk is writable and information needed to correctly write to the disk.

Usage
ATIP is used as a method of putting data on an optical medium, specifically:
 Manufacturer
 Writable/Rewritable
 Dye type
 Spiral length in blocks
 Rated speed
 Audio

These features are rather important to the function as it lets the drive know if it is writable. If the disc is re-writable, and the ATIP is damaged, it will not be able to write more than once. Also, it lets the drive know what the maximum write speed available for the disc is, and how much space (in blocks) the disc holds.

Function
Every writable disc has at least four layers:
 Disc substrate – the bulk of the disc is 1.2 mm thick, and is usually injection molded from polycarbonate plastic.
 Recording layer – a thin coating of dye on recordable discs, or a sandwich of metals for rewriteable discs.
 Reflective layer – a thin layer of silver, a silver alloy, or gold.
 Protective coating – a clear lacquer which is spin-coated over the top of the disc and cured with ultraviolet light.

The polycarbonate layer has a spiral pre-groove that is formed when the disc substrate is injection molded against a stamper. The read/write laser in the drive will follow this pre-groove track as it is writing, in order to maintain the spacing between the written tracks with a high degree of accuracy. This spiral has a wobble frequency introduced into it, which the drive can read while it is writing. The drive will synchronize the rotation speed to the reference speed of the wobble signal, allowing it to maintain an accurate linear velocity (the speed of the track as it passes the laser). This wobble is further modulated with a timecode reference signal allowing the drive to approximately locate specific blocks of data on the disc. This modulated signal is known as ATIP.

References
 

Compact disc